An ironworks or iron works is a building or site where iron is smelted and where heavy iron and steel products are made.

Iron Works may also refer to:

 Iron Works, a neighborhood in Brookfield, Connecticut
 Clay City, Kentucky, known as Iron Works during the early 19th century
 Iron Works, the label that produced Liege Lord